Seeta is a 1960 Indian Malayalam-language film, directed and produced by Kunchacko, based on the Ramayana epic. The film stars Prem Nazir, Kusalakumari, Thikkurissy Sukumaran Nair and Hari. The musical score is by V. Dakshinamoorthy. Seetha was a box office hit.

Plot

Cast 
Prem Nazir as Rama
Kusalakumari as Sita
Thikkurissy Sukumaran Nair as Valmiki
Hari as Lava
T. R. Omana as Malini
Dr. N. Rajan Nair as Lakshmana
J. Sasikumar as Vasishtha
Kanchana as Kausalya
S. P. Pillai as Mooshakan

Soundtrack 
The music was composed by V. Dakshinamoorthy, with R. K. Shekhar acting as his assistant to make musical arrangements. Seeta was the first film on which Dakshinamoorthy and Shekhar collaborated, and Shekhar would continue working as Dakshinamoorthy's assistant for the next fourteen years. Lyrics were written by Abhayadev. The song "Pattupadi Urakkam Njan", sung by P. Susheela, became a hit. This was Susheela's first Malayalam song.

References

External links 
 

1960 films
1960s Malayalam-language films
Films based on the Ramayana
Films directed by Kunchacko